Sir James Pennyman, 6th Baronet  (1736–1808) was a British politician who sat in the House of Commons for 26 years from 1770 to 1796.

Life 
Pennyman was the only son of Ralph Pennyman of Beverley and his wife Bridget Gee, daughter of Thomas Gee of Bishop Burton, Yorkshire and was baptized on 6 December 1736. He was educated at Westminster School in 1749, and matriculated at Christ Church, Oxford in 1756. He married firstly Elizabeth Grey, daughter of Sir Henry Grey, 2nd Baronet of Howick, Northumberland on 9 December 1762. He succeeded his father in 1768, and succeeded his uncle in the baronetcy on 14 January 1770.

Pennyman was elected Member of Parliament for Scarborough at a by-election on 27 November 1770. Pennyman employed the future Methodist leader Elizabeth Rhodes during the later 1770s as a governess to his daughter. Rhodes witnessed the Gordon Riots from Pennyman's home in 1780.

At the 1774 general election he was elected MP for Beverley and was re-elected in 1780, 1784 and 1790. He stood down at the 1796.

Pennyman made a second marriage to Mary Maleham (or Matcham) of Westminster in May 1801. He died on 27 March 1808.

His first wife, Lady Pennyman (who died only a few weeks before his second marriage), is buried in Dawlish parish church with a monument by John Flaxman.

References

 

1736 births
1808 deaths
British MPs 1768–1774
British MPs 1774–1780
British MPs 1780–1784
British MPs 1784–1790
British MPs 1790–1796
Members of the Parliament of Great Britain for English constituencies
Baronets in the Baronetage of England